Phoenix Tower is a 434 ft (132m) tall skyscraper in Houston, Texas. It was completed in 1984 and has 34 floors. It is the 36th tallest building in the city.

The Phoenix Tower is adjacent to Greenway Plaza and located in an area between Downtown Houston and Uptown. A Jack Nicklaus-designed nine-hole putting green is on top of the building's parking garage, conceived by the building's owners as a way for tenants to relax in the middle of the day. The tower has  of office space. The tower was purchased by Parkway Properties in December, 2012 for US$124.5 million.

Trico Marine Services, a former corporate tenant, relocated its corporate headquarters to The Woodlands. Trico maintains a minor presence in the tower. In 2009 Trico sublet  to the law firm Edison, McDowell & Hetherington.

The Phoenix Tower was the former headquarters for Champion Technologies. After its acquisition by Ecolab, it formed the combined company of Nalco Champion. The new company will office a large part of its employees as it consolidates its operations.

In 1983, Hurricane Alicia's winds sent debris from the parking deck that was under construction onto the Buffalo Speedway.

See also
List of tallest buildings in Houston

References

External links
Phoenix Tower-Parkway Properties
Phoenix Tower
Emporis
Skyscraperpage

Skyscraper office buildings in Houston
Office buildings completed in 1984
HKS, Inc. buildings